Albert Edwin Avey (29 May 1886 - 25 September 1963) was an American philosopher and Professor of Philosophy at Ohio State University.
He is known for his works on conceptual cognition and the philosophy of religion.

Books
 Handbook in the history of philosophy. (New York : Barnes & Noble, 1954] 
 Readings in philosophy, (Columbus, O., R.G. Adams and Co., 1921)

References

External links

1886 births
1963 deaths
20th-century American philosophers
American philosophy academics
Philosophy writers
Ohio State University faculty
Yale University alumni
People from Hannibal, Missouri